The 1840 New Hampshire gubernatorial election was held on March 10, 1840.

Incumbent Democratic Governor John Page defeated Whig nominee Enos Stevens with 58.11% of the vote.

General election

Candidates
John Page, Democratic, incumbent Governor
Enos Stevens, Whig, incumbent member of the Executive Council of New Hampshire

Results

Notes

References

1840
New Hampshire
Gubernatorial